The Quaint and Curious Quest of Johnny Longfoot is a children's comic fantasy novel by Catherine Besterman. Based on a Polish folktale, it tells the story of a shoe king's son who outwits guard dogs and a bear and is sent on a quest for gold and seven-league boots by a cat. The novel, illustrated by Warren Chappell, was first published in 1947 and was a Newbery Honor recipient in 1948.

References

External links
Online edition of The Quaint and Curious Quest of Johnny Longfoot at A Celebration of Women Writers

1947 American novels
1947 children's books
Children's fantasy novels
American children's novels
Newbery Honor-winning works
Novels based on fairy tales
Books about cats